The Sentinals were a surf rock band from San Luis Obispo, California (1961–1965).  The band is notable for a Latino influence in some works, such as "Latin'ia" (1962).  Notable band members included Tommy Nuñes, drummer John Barbata (later of The Turtles and Jefferson Starship) and Lee Michaels (then known as Michael Olsen) on keyboards.

Background
Even though a surf group, they added an appealing Latin accent to their music. According to band member John Barbata, as mentioned in Craig Fenton's Take Me to a Circus Tent: The Jefferson Airplane Flight Manual, the group was actually rhythm and Blues.

Career

1960s
In the summer of 1962, the group toured the country and opened for bands including The Coasters and The Righteous Brothers. Also that year, through Norman Knowles, the group came across Tony Hilder, whose company Anthony Music would later become involved in legal action with Del-Fi records, slapping the label with a $122,000 lawsuit as a result of royalties not being paid. This was relating to an alleged agreement for the masters of albums by The Sentinels, The Centurians, Dave Myers and the Surftones, etc.

In 1963 the band was featured in the March 16 issue of Central Coast Living section of The Tribune. Kenny Hinkle was pictured on the cover. Also that year, their Big Surf album was released on the Del-Fi label.

According to Robert J. Dalley's book Surfin' Guitars: Instrumental Surf Bands of the Sixties, the  1965 line up consisted of John Barbata, Ron Gornell, Kenny Hinkle, Norman Knowles, and Tommy Nuñes.

1970s to 1980s
In August 1984, they got together and played at the San Luis Obispo Officer's Club. This live reunion was for their twenty-year class reunion.

1990s to present
In 1996, Del-Fi released the Big Surf Hits various artists compilation album, featuring their track "Big Surf". Other artists on the album were The Impacts, Dave Myers and The Surftones and The Lively Ones.

Members
 John Barbata: drums, 1961–66
 Ron Gornell: organ, 1965–66
 Peter Graham: guitar, 1961–66
 Kenny Hinkle: bass, 1962–66
 Bobby Holmquist: saxophone, 1961–64
 Norman Knowles: saxophone, 1965–66
 Lee Michaels (Michael Olsen): organ, vocals, 1966
 Tommy Nuñes: guitar 1961–66
 Ronnie Page: vocals, 1966
 John Ryan: bass
 Harry Sackrider: guitar, 1964–65
 Mike Scott: drums
 Gary Winburne: bass, 1961–63

Discography

References

Surf music groups
Rock music groups from California
Musical groups established in 1961
Musical groups disestablished in 1965
Del-Fi Records artists
Era Records artists
1961 establishments in California